, was a Japanese Buddhist priest and poet. Little is known of his life except that his secular name was Kasa no Ason Maro. While serving at a temple in the north of Kyūshū, he was a member of Ōtomo no Tabito's literary coterie. His few surviving pieces are collected in the Man'yōshū.

References
 Steven D. Carter, Traditional Japanese Poetry: An Anthology, Stanford U. 1993 
 Our life in this world by Sami Mansei
 Man'yoshu Book 3 poem 351

Japanese male poets
Japanese Buddhist clergy
8th-century clergy
8th-century Japanese poets